Orašje is a city and the capital of Posavina Canton of the Federation of Bosnia and Herzegovina, an entity of Bosnia and Herzegovina. It is situated in the northern part of Bosnia and Herzegovina, on the banks of river Sava near the border with Croatia. As of 2013, it has a population of 19,861 inhabitants, while city of Orašje has a population of 3,614 inhabitants.

Demographics

Population

Ethnic composition

Sports
The local football club is HNK Orašje.

Notable people
Zdenko Baotić, footballer
Bakir Beširević, former footballer
Ivo Gregurević, actor
Edin Husić, footballer
Miro Klaić, former football player
Mato Neretljak, former footballer
Marko Topić, former footballer
Aleksandar Živković, footballer

References

External links

 

 
Populated places in Orašje
Bosnia and Herzegovina–Croatia border crossings